Gilbert Unified School District #41 (GUSD), also known as Gilbert Public Schools (GPS), is a school district based in Gilbert, Arizona, United States in the Phoenix metropolitan area. The  district is the 7th largest in Arizona, and serves over 34,000 students at 39 schools across Gilbert, Chandler, and Mesa, Arizona.

In 2018, the district was awarded "4th Best School District in America" by the National Council for Home Safety and Security and "Best Public School/District" in the Best of Gilbert 2018 issue of the East Valley Tribune. As of spring 2019, thirteen GPS schools have earned the "A+ School of Excellence™ Award" from the Arizona Educational Foundation.

History

In 1900, the first school, in Gilbert, was built on the southwest corner of Baseline and Cooper Roads. This school was moved, in 1909, to the northeast corner of Guadalupe and Cooper Roads. It was named Highland because it was the highest land south of the Salt River. These schools were part of the Mesa Unified School District#4.

In 1913, with the completion of its first elementary school, the Gilbert School District #41 was formed. The new school was located on the corner of Elliot and Gilbert roads, and consisted of four classrooms, two offices, an auditorium and a full basement below the auditorium. In 1977, the building closed for classroom use and in 1982 it became the Gilbert Historical Museum.

In 1917, an election was held "for the purpose of establishing and maintaining a high school" in the recently formed Gilbert School District #41. Gilbert's first high school, Gilbert High School, opened in 1917 on the southwest corner of Gilbert and Elliot roads. The first graduating class, consisting of 4 graduates, was in 1918. Gilbert High School has since been relocated, and the original site is now the Gilbert Public Schools district administration building.

Since opening its first school in 1913, Gilbert Public Schools has grown to serve over 35,000 students at 40 schools across Gilbert, Chandler and Mesa, Arizona.

On March 13, 2020, Gilbert Public Schools made an announcement to the community, announcing all schools would be shut down until further notice, due to COVID-19 (coronavirus).

Schools
Schools in the district include: 26 elementary schools (Pre K-6); 6 junior high schools (7-8), 5 high schools (9-12), 2 Academies, 1 Global academy, and 1 Alternative Education (7-12).

High schools

Junior high schools

Elementary schools

(Enrollment 100th Day, 2018)

 Ashland Ranch - 819
 Augusta Ranch - 1019
 Boulder Creek - 633
 Burk - 382
 Canyon Rim - 842
 Carol Rae Ranch - 572
 Finley Farms - 652
 Gilbert Elementary - 527
 Greenfield Elementary - 955
 Harris - 460
 Highland Park - 888
 Houston - 395
 Islands - N/A
 Meridian - 831
 Mesquite - 599
 Oak Tree - 580
 Patterson - 601
 Pioneer - 553
 Playa del Rey - 460
 Quartz Hill - 663
 Settler's Point - 634
 Sonoma Ranch - 476
 Spectrum - 624
 Superstition Springs - 714
 Towne Meadows - 711
 Val Vista Lakes - 539

Academies and alternative education
 Canyon Valley School (Grades 9-12) - Alternative Education (322 enrolled as of 100th Day 2018)
 Distance Learning Online (Grades 7-12) — Gilbert Public Schools offers its own online schooling program through its Distance Learning Center. Classes range from History to Physical Education. Gilbert accepts credits earned from major online schools, such as Primavera.
 Global Academy - opened August, 2011
 Gilbert Classical Academy (Grades 7-12) — opened August 2007; replacing the GPS Technology and Leadership Academy (526 enrolled as of 100th Day 2018)
 Neely Traditional Academy (Grades K-6) — also known as Neely Elementary (779 enrolled as of 100th Day 2018)
 Performance Academy at Mesquite Elementary (Grades 4-8)
 Traditional Program at Canyon Rim Elementary (Grades K-6)
 Traditional Program at Spectrum Elementary (Grades K-6)

Awards
 The district was awarded "4th Best School District in America" by the National Council for Home Safety and Security in 2017 and 2018.
 GPS was voted "Best Public School/District" in the Best of Gilbert annual issues of the East Valley Tribune in 2017 and 2018. The runners up were Chandler Unified School District and Higley Unified School District. 
 Thirteen GPS schools have earned the "A+ School of Excellence™ Award" from the Arizona Educational Foundation as of spring 2019.
 Playa del Rey Elementary School (Grades K-6) - opened in 1994. April 2011 was the second time the school has received the A+ 'School of Excellence' award. The Principal Robyn Conrad was named Arizona's principal of the year in October 2010.
 Neely Traditional Academy (Grades K-6) - is an elementary school in Gilbert, Arizona, United States. The school was opened in 1981, and became  in 1999. Neely received the National Blue Ribbon School award in 2009.

See also
 East Valley Institute of Technology
 Mesa Public Schools

References

External links
 

School districts in Maricopa County, Arizona
1913 establishments in Arizona
School districts established in 1913